Priodiscus serratus is a species of air-breathing land snail, a terrestrial pulmonate gastropod mollusk in the family Streptaxidae.

Distribution 
The distribution of Priodiscus serratus includes:
 Seychelles

References

Streptaxidae
Gastropods described in 1868